Survivor Česko & Slovensko is a joint Czech-Slovak version of the reality television game show Survivor. Its first broadcast was on January 17, 2022.

Seasons

References

External links
 https://novaplus.nova.cz/porad/survivor

Czech reality television series
Slovak reality television series
Survivor (franchise)
TV Nova (Czech TV channel) original programming
Markíza original programming